The Quetta–Taftan Railway Line (also referred as Main Line 4 or ML-4) is one of four main railway lines in Pakistan, operated and maintained by Pakistan Railways. Inward from Pakistan's most western edge it begins at Quetta station and has services that continue beyond Koh-e-Taftan station in high mountains, west. It has 23 active stations including Quetta, being an interchange, and Taftan, Balochistan, northeast of the dark volcano peak, Taftan. Many or all main services since 1940 (and 1922 to 1931) terminate on the natural continuation in eastern Iran at the high city of Zahedan, which sees a change of gauge (of track and rolling stock) for accessing the Trans-Iranian Railway.

History
Originally known as the "Trans–Baluchistan Railway", the line was built as part of a strategic military route between British India (specifically the part now Pakistan) and Persia (now Iran). The Quetta to Nushki branch was approved by Lord George Hamilton, Secretary of State for India, in August 1902, and it was opened on 15 November 1905. The part west of Nushki towards Iran was named the Nushki Extension Railway. Work started on it in September 1916 under the charge of P.C. Young as Engineer-in-Chief and it reached the Iranian town of Duzdap (now Zahedan, a small city) on 1 October 1922. By the time the railway reached Duzdap, the British had already demobilized their forces in East Persia in March 1921 which took away the importance of the newly built part. So much so that in 1931, the 221–kilometer section between Nok Kundi and Duzdap (Zahedan) was closed and track removed to be used elsewhere. World War II however, renewed interest in the Quetta-Zahedan link. British forces wanted to aid the Soviet forces by supplying material through Persia. Aid through Persia proved unnecessary (due to successful Arctic convoys of World War II and similar supplies) but the Quetta-Zahedan link was reopened on 20 April 1940 in Zahedan.

Stations
The stations are:

See also
 Karachi–Peshawar Railway Line
 Rohri-Chaman railway line
 Railway lines in Pakistan

External links
 The Trans-Baluchistan Railway All Things Pakistan July 13, 2007, now an archived website
Pilgrimage to Dalbandin by Salman Rashid  posted  January 2013. The author's father was an Assistant Engineer with  North Western Railway   at Dalbandin from April 1943 to December 1944

References

Railway stations on Quetta–Taftan Railway Line
Railway lines opened in 1905
5 ft 6 in gauge railways in Pakistan
Rail transport in Balochistan, Pakistan
1905 establishments in India